Anton Crihan (born July 10, 1893, Sîngerei, Bessarabia Governorate – January 9, 1993, St. Louis, Mo, United States of America) was a Bessarabian politician, lawyer, author, economist, professor and journalist. He was a member of Sfatul Țării (1917), adviser to the Secretary of State for Agriculture in the General Directorate of the Republic of Moldova (1917), deputy in the Parliament of Romania (1919, 1920, 1922, 1932), adviser to the Secretary of State at the Ministry of Agriculture and Domains (1932–1933), professor at the Polytechnic University of Iasi and at the Faculty of Agronomy in Chisinau (1934–1940).

Biography 
Anton Crihan is the representative of the thirteenth generation, male, of the old Moldavian boyar family, the first mention of the reign of Stephen the Great. The Prince's Book of Constantine Movilă states that Anton Crihan's ancestors honored the boyar's title of "paharnic". He studied at the Bălți High School for boys and the University of Odessa, Faculty of Economics.

Crihan served as Member of Sfatul Țării (1917–1918), the Parliament of Romania, and the Government of Romania. After World War I and the Communist revolution in Russia, Crihan, was among the handful of campaigners who succeeded in annexing most of Bessarabia to Romania. He became politically active in Romania, which was then governed by a constitutional monarchy. Trained as an economist, he served on the Central Committee of the National Peasant Party, was elected to several terms in Parliament and was appointed Agriculture Minister. After the Soviet takeover, Crihan went into hiding and then fled on foot. He made his way across Europe spending time in Paris to complete a PhD in economics at the Sorbonne.  He finally arrived in the United States in 1949, where he delivered lectures and wrote articles and books championing the reunification of Moldavia and Romania. In the United States he married Olivia Lula, a niece of Petru Groza. Moldavia, now known as Moldova, gained independence when the Soviet Union disintegrated in late 1991.

He died in Saint-Louis, United States, but to his will, he was buried in Chisinau (in the Central Cemetery).

Works 
 Capitalul străin în Rusia (1915)
 Chestiunea agrară în Basarabia (1917)
 Cum s'a facut unirea Basarabiei cu România (1969)
 O scrisoare catre Generalul C. Petre-Lazar (1976)
 Romanian Rights to Bessarabia According to Certain Russian Sources (1986)

Honours 
 Order Ferdinand I  
 Steaua României
 A street in the center of Chisinau, the capital of the Republic of Moldova has been named after Anton Crihan. (See strada Anton Crihan).

Gallery

Bibliography 
 Gheorghe E. Cojocaru, Sfatul Țării: itinerar, Civitas, Chişinău, 1998,  
 Mihai Taşcă, Sfatul Țării şi actualele autorităţi locale, "Timpul de dimineaţă", no. 114 (849), June 27, 2008 (page 16) 
 Eremia, Anatol (2001) (în română). Unitatea patrimoniului onomastic românesc. Toponimie. Antroponimie (ed. ediţie jubiliară). Chişinău: Centrul Naţional de Terminologie, ed. "Iulian". p. 57. .
 Alexandru Chiriac. Membrii Sfatului Ţării. 1917–1918. Dicţionar, Editura Fundaţiei Culturale Române, București, 2001.

Notes

External links 
 Anton Crihan Dead; Moldova Exile, 99, Escaped Soviet Rule
 Arhiva pentru Sfatul Tarii 
 Deputaţii Sfatului Ţării şi Lavrenti Beria 
 Biblio Polis – Vol. 25 (2008) Nr. 1 (Serie nouă)
 2013 Postage stamp issued by the Republic of Moldova

Romanian people of Moldovan descent
Moldovan MPs 1917–1918
Members of the Chamber of Deputies (Romania)
1893 births
1993 deaths
People from Sîngerei District
Odesa University alumni
Moldovan economists
20th-century Romanian economists
National Peasants' Party politicians
20th-century Romanian politicians
Romanian Ministers of Agriculture
Moldovan anti-communists
Officers of the Order of the Star of Romania
Romanian expatriates in France
Romanian emigrants to the United States